Informal learning is characterized "by a low degree of planning and organizing in terms of the learning context, learning support, learning time, and learning objectives". It differs from formal learning, non-formal learning, and self-regulated learning, because it has no set objective in terms of learning outcomes, but an intent to act from the learner's standpoint (e.g., to solve a problem). Typical mechanisms of informal learning include trial and error or learning-by-doing, modeling, feedback, and reflection. For learners this includes heuristic language building, socialization, enculturation, and play. Informal learning is a pervasive ongoing phenomenon of learning via participation or learning via knowledge creation, in contrast with the traditional view of teacher-centered learning via knowledge acquisition. Estimates suggest that about 70-90 percent of adult learning takes place informally and outside educational institutions.

The term is often conflated, however, with non-formal learning, and self-directed learning. It is widely used in the context of corporate training and education in relation to return on investment (ROI), or return on learning (ROL). It is also widely used when referring to science education, in relation to citizen science, or informal science education.  The conflated meaning of informal and non-formal learning explicates mechanisms of learning that organically occur outside the realm of traditional instructor-led programs, e.g., reading self-selected books, participating in self-study programs, navigating performance support materials and systems, incidental skills practice, receptivity of coaching or mentoring, seeking advice from peers, or participation in communities of practice, to name a few. Informal learning is common in communities where individuals have opportunities to observe and participate in social activities. Advantages of informal learning cited include flexibility and adaptation to learning needs, direct transfer of learning into practice, and rapid resolution of (work-related) problems. For improving employees' performance, task execution is considered the most important source of learning.

Characterizations

Informal learning can be characterized as the following:
 It usually takes place outside educational establishments;
 It does not follow a specified curriculum and is not often professionally organized but rather originates accidentally, sporadically, in association with certain occasions, from changing practical requirements;
 It is not necessarily planned pedagogically, systematically according to fixed subjects, test and qualification-oriented, but rather, either unconsciously incidental or consciously intended intuition, holistically problem-related, and related to actual situations and fitness for life;
 It is experienced directly in its "natural" function of everyday life.
 It is often spontaneous and creative.
 It is a key component to an alternative learning system coined, Learning by Observing and Pitching In (LOPI), which is based on the learning methods observed to be common in many Indigenous American communities.

History
The origin of informal learning has been traced back to John Dewey through his theories about learning from experience. The American philosopher Mary Parker Follett broadened the context of informal education from school to all areas of everyday life and described education as a continuous life task. Building on this work by Dewey and Follett, the American educator Eduard C. Lindemann first used the term "informal learning". The term was later introduced by Malcolm Knowles when he published his work, Informal Adult Education in 1950.

At first, informal learning was only delimited from formal school learning and nonformal learning in courses. Marsick and Watkins take up this approach and go one step further in their definition. They, too, begin with the organizational form of learning and call those learning processes informal which are non-formal or not formally organized and are not financed by institutions. An example for a wider approach is Livingstone's definition which is oriented towards autodidactic and self-directed learning and places special emphasis on the self-definition of the learning process by the learner. Livingstone explained that explicit informal learning is distinguished from tacit informal learning and socialization in the sense that the individual seeks learning in this setting and creates the conditions for it by putting himself in situations or engaging with others so that learning is possible.

Differences between informal and non-formal learning

As noted above, informal learning is often confused with non-formal learning. Non-formal learning has been used to often describe organized learning outside of the formal education system, either being short-term, voluntary, and having, few if any, prerequisites. However, they typically have a curriculum and often a facilitator. As stated on the non-formal learning page, non-formal learning can be seen in various structured learning situations, such as swimming lessons, community-based sports programs and conference style seminars.

Decius' 2020 work points out that non-formal learning is more of a subordinate type of formal learning and less similar to informal learning, using the following example: A learner would acquire language skills in a non-formal way by voluntarily attending an adult education course. Depending on the level of requirements, this would differ little or not at all from a comparable formal university course in terms of structure, content and learning support. The only difference here would be that students attend the course as part of their "job" (studies), but the voluntary learner attends in his or her free time. Thus, the supposed difference between formal and non-formal learning is rather a social-normative—not learning-theoretical—demarcation.

Other perspective
Merriam et al. in 2007 stated:

In 2012, Bennett extended Schugurenksky's conceptualization from 2000 of informal learning by recommending four modes of informal learning:
self-directed, which is conscious and intentional
incidental, which is conscious and unintentional
tacit, which replaces socialization and is both nonconscious and unintentional
integrative, which is nonconscious and intentional. 
Drawing upon implicit processing literature, she further defined integrative learning as "a learning process that combines intentional nonconscious processing of tacit knowledge with conscious access to learning products and mental images" and she theorized two possible sub-processes: knowledge shifting and knowledge sublimation, which describe limited access learners have to tacit knowledge.

However, the assumption that informal learning can also be non-intentional contradicts more recent definitions of informal learning. For a meaningful distinction from incidental learning, scholars argued that informal learning can be viewed as a conscious process, but one in which the learner does not set a learning goal, but rather has an intention to act. In contrast, if the learning person has a learning goal in mind and independently monitors goal achievement, it is self-regulated learning.

In American Indigenous communities
People in many Indigenous communities of the Americas often learn through observation and participation in everyday life of their respective communities and families. Barbara Rogoff, a professor of psychology, and her colleagues describe the ways in which children in Indigenous communities can learn by observing and participating in community endeavors, having an eagerness to contribute, fulfilling valuable roles, and finding a sense of belonging in their community.  These learning experiences rely on children's incorporation in the community and the child's attentiveness. This form of informal learning allows the children to collaborate in social endeavors, which grants the child the opportunity to learn by pitching in.

Learning occurs through socialization processes in one's culture and community. Learning by observing and pitching in (LOPI) is an Informal learning model often seen in many Indigenous communities of the Americas. Children can be seen participating alongside adults in many daily activities within the community. An example is the process where children learn slash-and-burn agriculture by being present in the situation and contributing when possible.  Noteworthy is children's own initiative and assumption of responsibility to perform tasks for the households' benefit. Many Indigenous communities provide self-paced opportunities to kids, and allow exploration and education without parental coercion. Collaborative input is highly encouraged and valued. Both children and adults are actively involved in shared endeavors. Their roles as learner and expert are flexible, while the observer participates with active concentration. Indigenous ways of learning include practices such as observation, experiential learning, and apprenticeship.

Child work, alongside and combined with play, occupies an important place in American Indigenous children's time and development. The interaction of a Navajo girl assisting her mother weaving and who eventually becomes a master weaver herself illustrates how the child's presence and the availability of these activities allow the child to learn through observation.  Children start at the periphery, observing and imitating those around them, before moving into the center of activities under supervision and guidance. An example of 2-year-old Indigenous Mexican girl participating in digging-the-holes project with her mother highlights children's own initiation to help, after watching, and enthusiasm to share the task with family and community. Work is part of a child's development from an early age, starting with simple tasks that merge with play and develop to various kinds of useful work.  The circumstances of everyday routine create opportunities for the culturally meaningful activities and sensitive interactions on which a child's development depends. Children of the Chillihuani observe their environment as a place of respect, and learn from observation. Many of them become herders by informal learning in observation.

Children in Nicaragua will often learn to work the land or learn to become street vendors by watching other individuals in their community perform it.  These activities provide opportunities for children to learn and develop through forms of social learning which are made up of everyday experiences rather than a deliberate curriculum, and contain ordinary setting in which children's social interaction and behavior occur.  Informal learning for children in American Indigenous communities can take place at work where children are expected to contribute.

Nonverbal communication as a learning tool
In terms of the cultural variation between traditional Indigenous American and European-American middle class, the prevalence of nonverbal communication can be viewed as being dependent on each culture's definition of achievement. Often in mainstream middle-class culture, success in school and work settings is gained through practicing competitiveness and working for personal gain. The learning and teaching practices of traditional Indigenous Americans generally prioritize harmony and cooperation over personal gain. In order to achieve mutual respect in teachings, what is often relied on in Indigenous American culture is nonverbal communication.

Nonverbal communication in Indigenous communities creates pathways of knowledge by watching and then doing. An example where nonverbal behavior can be used as a learning tool can be seen in Chillihuani culture. Children in this community learn about growing crops by observing the actions and respect adults have for the land. They learn that caring for their crops is vital for them to grow and in turn for the community to thrive. Similarly, when children participate in rituals, they learn the importance of being part of the community by watching how everyone interacts. This again needs no explicit verbal communication, it relies solely on observing the world around. Chillihuani culture does not explicitly verbalize expectations. Their knowledge is experienced rather than explained through modeled behavior for community benefit.

In the indigenous culture of the Matsigenka, infants are kept in close proximity to their mother and members of the community. The infant does not go far from the mother at any time. In this way, the child is encouraged to explore away from the mother and other family members who will still keep watch. As the child wanders he may come to a place that is unknown and potentially dangerous but the mother will not stop him, she will just watch as he explores. The lack of verbal reprimand or warning from an adult or elder enable the child to assimilate his surroundings more carefully.

Formal and informal education
To fully understand informal learning it is useful to define the terms "formal" and "informal" education. Formal education can be defined as a setting that is highly institutionalized, can be possibly bureaucratic,  while being curriculum driven, and formally recognized with grades, diplomas, or other forms of certifications. Informal education is closely tied in with informal learning, which occurs in a variety of places, such as at home, work, and through daily interactions and shared relationships among members of society. Informal learning often takes place outside educational establishments, and does not follow a specified curriculum and may originate accidentally, or sporadically, in association with certain occasions, although that is not always the case. Informal education can occur in the formal arena when concepts are adapted to the unique needs of individual students.

Research and data
Merriam and others (2007) state: "studies of informal learning, especially those asking about adults' self-directed learning projects, reveal that upwards of 90 percent of adults are engaged in hundreds of hours of informal learning. It has also been estimated that the great majority (upwards of 70 percent) of learning in the workplace is informal ... although billions of dollars each year are spent by business and industry on formal training programs". Both formal and informal learning are considered integral processes for Virtual Human Resource Development, with informal learning the stronger form.

Coffield uses the metaphor of an iceberg to illustrate the dominant status of informal learning, which at the same time has much lower visibility in the education sector compared to formal learning: The part of the iceberg that is visibly above the water surface and makes up one third represents formal learning; the two thirds below the water surface that are invisible at first glance represent informal learning. While formal learning can be compared to a bus ride—the route is predetermined and the same for all passengers—informal learning is more like a ride on a bicycle, where the person riding can determine the route and speed individually.

The Octagon Model of informal learning
According to the Octagon Model of informal learning by Decius, Schaper, and Seifert from 2019, informal learning comprises eight components. 
The octagon model is based on the dynamic model of informal learning by Tannenbaum et al. from 2010. The dynamic model contains the four factors "experience/action", "feedback", "reflection", and "learning intention". According to the model, each factor can trigger another factor and thus precede it, but can also follow any other factor. Accordingly, the model does not contain a fixed starting or ending point, which is intended to illustrate the dynamic nature of learning. The learner may go through each factor in the informal learning process one or more times. However, the learning process is considered most efficient when all four factors are involved in it.

The octagon model extends the dynamic model by dividing the four factors into two components each. This allows the components of informal learning to be described more precisely. The factor "experience/action" from the dynamic model is divided into "trying and applying own ideas" (i.e., trial and error) and "model learning" (i.e., observing and adopting successful behaviors of other persons) in the octagon model. The factor "feedback" includes the components "direct feedback" (i.e., obtaining feedback on one's own behavior) and "vicarious feedback" (i.e., exchanging experiences with other people on success-critical work and life situations). The "reflection" factor includes the components "anticipatory reflection" (i.e., planning task steps while considering possible obstacles) and "subsequent reflection" (i.e., thinking about ways to improve after completing a work task). The factor "learning intention" consists of the components "Intrinsic intent to learn" (i.e., learning for the pleasure of the learning process) as well as "Extrinsic intent to learn" (i.e., learning due to external incentives such as praise from other people or—in the work context—the prospect of positive career development).

Experiences and examples

Informal knowledge is information that has not been externalized or captured and the primary locus of the knowledge may be inside someone's head. For example, in the cause of language acquisition, a mother may teach a child basic concepts of grammar and language at home, prior to the child entering a formal education system. In such a case, the mother has a tacit understanding of language structures, syntax and morphology, but she may not be explicitly aware of what these are. She understands the language and passes her knowledge on to her offspring.

Other examples of informal knowledge transfer include instant messaging, a spontaneous meeting on the Internet, a phone call to someone who has information you need, a live one-time-only sales meeting introducing a new product, a chat-room in real time, a chance meeting by the water cooler, a scheduled Web-based meeting with a real-time agenda, a tech walking you through a repair process, or a meeting with your assigned mentor or manager.

Experience indicates that much of the learning for performance is informal. Those who transfer their knowledge to a learner are usually present in real time. Such learning can take place over the telephone or through the Internet, as well as in person.

In the UK, the government formally recognized the benefits of informal learning in "The Learning Revolution" White Paper published on March 23, 2009. The Learning Revolution Festival ran in October 2009 and funding has been used by libraries—which offer a host of informal learning opportunities such as book groups, "meet the author" events and family history sessions—to run activities such as The North East Festival of Learning.

Trends in formal and informal learning
40% of adults have self-taught themselves at some point and respondents in a survey indicated that they were twice as likely to participate in independent learning as traditional learning.
The average adult spends 10 hours a week (500 hours a year) on informal learning practices.
As a whole, this type of knowledge is more learner-centered and situational in response to the interests or needed application of the skill to a particular workforce. Formal training programs have limited success in increasing basic skills for individuals older than age 25, therefore, these individuals rely mostly on on-the-job training.

Although rates of formal education have increased, many adults entering the workforce are lacking the basic math, reading and interpersonal skills that the "unskilled" labor force requires. The lines between formal and informal learning have been blurred due to the higher rates of college attendance. The largest increase in population for manual or low-skilled labor is in individuals who attended college but did not receive a degree. A recent collection of cross-sectional surveys were conducted and polled employers across the United States to gauge which skills are required for jobs which do not require college degrees. These surveys concluded that 70% require some kind of customer service aspect, 61% require reading or writing paragraphs, 65% require math, 51% require the use of computers. In regards to training and academic credentials, 71% require a high school diploma, 61% require specific vocational experience. The rates of men entering the low-skilled labor force have remained static over the last fifty years, indicating a shift of less than 1%. Women's participation in the unskilled labor force has steadily increased and projections indicate that this trend will continue.

Business perspective
The majority of companies that provide training are currently involved only with the formal side of the continuum. Most of today's investments are on the formal side. The net result is that companies spend the most money on the smallest part—25%—of the learning equation. The other 75% of learning happens as the learner creatively "adopts and adapts to ever changing circumstances". The informal piece of the equation is not only larger, it's crucial to learning how to do anything.

 Fostering informal workplace learning
Managers often wonder how they can promote informal learning of their employees. However, a direct support of informal learning is considered difficult, because learning happens within the work process and cannot be planned by companies. An indirect support of learning by providing a positive learning environment is however possible. Social support by colleagues and managers should be mentioned in particular. More experienced colleagues can act as learning experts and mentors. Managers can act as role models with regard to obtaining and offering feedback on their own work performance. Admitting own failures and dealing with failures constructively also encourages employees to take advantage of learning opportunities at work. Training interventions can strengthen the meta-competence "learning to learn" among employees. The goal of such interventions is to perceive dynamic and unexpected situations as learning opportunities and to use problems and mistakes positively for one's own competence acquisition. In the long term, strategic personnel selection also makes it possible to preferentially hire applicants who are curious and self-learning-oriented.

Summary
Lifelong learning, as defined by the OECD, includes a combination of formal, non-formal and informal learning. Of these three, informal learning may be the most difficult to quantify or prove, but it remains critical to an individual's overall cognitive and social development throughout the lifespan.

See also
 Networked learning
 Unschooling

References

Further reading
 Ainsworth, Heather L. and Eaton, Sarah (2010). "Formal, Non-formal and Informal Learning in the Sciences".
 Airing, Monika and Brand, Betsy (1998). "The Teaching Firm: Where Productive Work and Learning Converge". Report on Research Findings and Implications. Center for Workforce Development: Education Development Center (EDC). Newton, MA January 1998.
 Bersin, Josh (2005). The Blended Learning Book, Best Practices, Proven Methodologies, Lessons Learned. 
 Coombs, P.H. (1985). The World Crisis in Education: A View from the Eighties. New York: Oxford University Press.
 Eaton, Sarah (2010). "Formal, Non-Formal and Informal learning: The Case of Literacy, Essential Skills, and Language Learning in Canada".
 Grebow, David. (2002). At the Watercooler of Learning. Retrieved June 9, 2009.
 Livingstone, D.W. (2001). Adults' Informal Learning: Definitions, Findings, Gaps and Future Research. Retrieved October 15, 2010.
 Livingstone, D.W. (2002). Mapping the Iceberg. Retrieved October 15, 2010.
 
 Organisation for Economic Co-operation and Development / Organisation de Coopération et de Développement Economiques (OECD). (n.d.) "Recognition of Non-formal and Informal Learning - Home"
 
 Schugurensky, D. (2000). The Forms of Informal Learning: Towards a Conceptualization of the Field. Retrieved October 15, 2010.
 Sommerlad, E., & Stern, E. (1999). Workplace Learning, Culture and Performance. London.

External links
 Cedefop European guidelines for validating non-formal and informal learning - 2nd edition, 2015
 infed - the encyclopaedia of informal education
 Informal Learning blog
 Teacher Blog about Informal Learning
 Learning Revolution White Paper
 North East Festival of Learning
  Validation of self-aCquired learning and cREdits trAnsfer in web design and compuTEr animation /CREATE/

Applied learning